There are three Union Street Historic Districts listed on the U.S. National Register of Historic Places:

Union Street Historic District (Newton, Massachusetts)
Union Street Historic District (Poughkeepsie, New York)
Union Street Historic District (Schenectady, New York)

It may also refer to:

Bradford-Union Street Historic District, in Plymouth, Massachusetts
North Union Street Historic District, in Concord, North Carolina
South Union Street Historic District (disambiguation), in several locations
Union Street-Academy Hill Historic District, in Montgomery, New York
West Union Street Historic District, in Morganton, North Carolina